Bannu Cantonment is a cantonment adjacent to Bannu in Khyber Pakhtunkhwa, Pakistan. It is the only cantonment in Bannu District and also the only one in the Bannu Division. It has a population of 8,320.

References

Cantonments of Pakistan